Westphalian ham (German: Westfälischer Schinken) is a ham produced from acorn-fed pigs raised in the forests of Westphalia, Germany. The resulting meat is dry cured and then smoked over a mixture of beechwood and juniper branches.

The hams are prepared for consumption solely by the process of smoking, which preserves them, and are typically eaten thinly sliced in their preserved state without additional cooking.

Westphalian ham is famed as a delicacy.

History
During his travels in Germany, Thomas Jefferson documented the production of Westphalian ham and aspects of the hogs used to produce it.

In the early 1900s, there were three varieties of Westphalia ham: kugel cut, boneless and rolled, and regulation ham.

In the early 1900s, significant quantities of Westphalian ham were being exported from Germany into the United States.

See also

 List of hams
 List of smoked foods
 Smoked ham

References

Further reading
 Sauerkraut Yankees: Pennsylvania Dutch Foods & Foodways - William Woys Weaver. pp. 44–45.
 Cassell's dictionary of cookery - Cassell, ltd. p. 1108.

Ham
Smoked meat
German cuisine